Miroslav Seman (born 1 January 1973) is a retired Slovak football goalkeeper, who played during the 1990s and 2000s. He played for a number of clubs in Slovakia,  Czech Republic and Cyprus.

Career 

In 2004, he signed for Nea Salamis Famagusta.

References

External links 

1973 births
Living people
Slovak footballers
Slovak expatriate footballers
MFK Zemplín Michalovce players
1. FC Tatran Prešov players
FC VSS Košice players
SK Dynamo České Budějovice players
Nea Salamis Famagusta FC players
MŠK Žilina players
Slovakia international footballers
Czech First League players
Slovak Super Liga players
Association football goalkeepers
People from Michalovce
Sportspeople from the Košice Region
Expatriate footballers in the Czech Republic
Slovak expatriate sportspeople in the Czech Republic
Expatriate footballers in Cyprus
Slovak expatriate sportspeople in Cyprus